George W. Perkins is an American producer of films and television series, most known for being one of the producers of the dramedy Desperate Housewives, of which he is one of the executive producers since 2006.

Beginning in the early 1980s Perkins produced or co-produced movies like the 1983 indie film Joysticks, Teen Wolf starring Michael J. Fox (1985), the 1986 thriller movie Extremities starring Farrah Fawcett and Who's Harry Crumb? from 1989, starring John Candy.

During the 1990s and 2000s, Perkins moved on to mainly producing telefilms. In addition he co-produced the 1997 action film Metro starring Eddie Murphy, and in 2003 he was one of the producers for the short lived thriller series Threat Matrix starring James Denton. Since 2004, he's been involved with producing Desperate Housewives, taking over the executive producer position for the 2007–2008 season.

External links
 

American film producers
American television producers
Living people
Year of birth missing (living people)